A cruise line is a company that operates cruise ships that operate on ocean or rivers and which markets cruises to the public. Cruise lines are distinct from passenger lines which are primarily concerned with transportation of passengers. Though cruise packages provided by cruise lines vary, there are some features most have in common, such as accommodation, all meals and entertainment. They may include alcohol and shore excursions, sometimes on additional payment.

Among cruise lines, some are direct descendants of the traditional passenger lines, while others were founded since the 1960s specifically for cruising. The business has been extremely volatile; the ships are massive capital expenditures with very high operating costs, and a slight dip in bookings can easily put a company out of business. Cruise lines frequently sell, renovate, or simply rename their ships just to keep up with travel trends.

A wave of failures and consolidations in the 1990s has led to many companies being bought by much larger holding companies and to operate as "brands" within larger corporations. Brands exist partly because of repeat customer loyalty, and also to offer different levels of quality and service. For instance, Carnival Corporation & plc owns both Carnival Cruise Line, whose former image were vessels that had a reputation as "party ships" for younger travellers, but have become large, modern, yet still profitable, and Holland America Line, whose ships cultivate an image of classic elegance.

A common practice in the cruise industry in listing cruise ship transfers and orders is to list the smaller operating company, not the larger holding corporation, as the recipient cruise line of the sale, transfer, or new order.  For example, Carnival Cruise Line and Holland America Line are the cruise lines whereas Carnival Corporation & plc and Royal Caribbean Group are considered holding corporations . This industry practice of using the brand, not the larger holding corporation, as the cruise line is also followed in the member cruise lines in Cruise Lines International Association (CLIA) and the member-based reviews of cruise lines.

See also

 List of cruise lines
 List of cruise ships
 List of largest cruise ships
 Cruising (maritime)

References

External links